= Speed limits in Bosnia and Herzegovina =

Four general speed limits apply on roads in Bosnia and Herzegovina:

- 50 km/h (31 mph) within inhabited places
- 80 km/h (50 mph) outside inhabited places
- 100 km/h (62 mph) on expressways (cesta za motorna vozila)
- 130 km/h (81 mph) on motorways (autoput or autocesta)

The limits shown above apply only if there are no other signs present, as the signs may prescribe a lower or a higher speed limit (limits of 80 km/h or higher can also be found within inhabited places).
